David Goverde (born April 9, 1970) is a Canadian former professional ice hockey player.

Goverde was born in Toronto, Ontario. As a youth, he played in the 1983 Quebec International Pee-Wee Hockey Tournament with the Toronto Young Nationals minor ice hockey team.

Goverde later played for the Los Angeles Kings in the National Hockey League.

References

External links
 

1970 births
Living people
Anaheim Bullfrogs players
Canadian ice hockey goaltenders
Detroit Falcons (CoHL) players
Empire State Cobras players
Los Angeles Kings draft picks
Los Angeles Kings players
Louisville RiverFrogs players
New Haven Nighthawks players
Orlando Rollergators players
Orlando Seals (ACHL) players
Orlando Seals (WHA2) players
Phoenix Roadrunners (IHL) players
Ice hockey people from Toronto
Sudbury Wolves players
Tacoma Sabercats players
Windsor Spitfires players